The 1900 Georgia Tech football team represented the Georgia Institute of Technology during the 1900 Southern Intercollegiate Athletic Association football season. The Georgia Tech Athletic Association was started after the winless season.

Schedule

References

Georgia Tech
Georgia Tech Yellow Jackets football seasons
Georgia Tech football